Joëlle F.G.M. Milquet (born 17 February 1961) is a Belgian politician from the Humanist Democratic Centre (CDH).

Education
In 1985, she took a post-graduate diploma in European law at the Universiteit van Amsterdam (UvA).

Career
She started her career at the Bar in Brussels. From 1995 to 1999 she was a delegate to the Belgian Senate. She has been the president of the CDH party since, and played a prominent role in the 2007-2008 formation negotiations for the Leterme I Government.

She was Deputy Prime Minister and Minister for Employment and Equal Opportunities in the Leterme I Government, which took office on 20 March 2008.

When the Leterme I government failed, Joëlle Milquet retained her seat on the Van Rompuy I Government, then on the Leterme II Government.

She was the Deputy Prime Minister, Minister of the Interior and for Equalities in the Di Rupo Government (2011-2014). In June 2014 she became minister of Lower education, Culture in the Government of the French Community.

Ms. Milquet was Vice Minister-President and Minister for Education and Culture in the Government of the French Community until 2016. She currently serves as Chair of the Security Committee of Brussels' Regional Parliament. In October 2017, Ms Joëlle Milquet was appointed Special Adviser to President Jean-Claude Juncker for the compensation of victims of crime.

As opinion maker and several times former minister she is often interviewed by Belgian newspapers and Television such as RTBF, Le Soir and La Libre Belgique, LN24, Paris Match etc..

In January 2021, she was appointed President of the European Centre for Electoral Support's Strategic and Advisory Committee which is one of the most important organisations implementing electoral and democracy assistance projects worldwide funded by the European Union and its Member States.

References

External links

 Joëlle Milquet on the Humanist Democratic Centre (CDH) website

1961 births
Living people
Centre démocrate humaniste politicians
Government ministers of Belgium
Interior ministers of Belgium
Members of the Belgian Federal Parliament
Politicians from Charleroi
Université catholique de Louvain alumni
21st-century Belgian politicians
20th-century Belgian politicians
20th-century Belgian women politicians
21st-century Belgian women politicians
Women government ministers of Belgium
Female interior ministers